Christian-Alexander Tröger (born 6 October 1969 in Munich, Bavaria) is a former swimmer from Germany, who won a total number of three bronze medals as a relay member at the Summer Olympics. He first did so in 1992 alongside Mark Pinger, Dirk Richter, and Steffen Zesner.

References 

  databaseOlympics.com
 

1969 births
Living people
Swimmers at the 1992 Summer Olympics
Swimmers at the 1996 Summer Olympics
Swimmers at the 2000 Summer Olympics
Olympic swimmers of Germany
Olympic bronze medalists for Germany
Sportspeople from Munich
Olympic bronze medalists in swimming
German male freestyle swimmers
Medalists at the FINA World Swimming Championships (25 m)
Universiade medalists in swimming
European Aquatics Championships medalists in swimming
Medalists at the 1996 Summer Olympics
Medalists at the 1992 Summer Olympics
Universiade bronze medalists for Germany
Medalists at the 1997 Summer Universiade